Christian Alusine Kamara-Taylor (June 3, 1917 – August 15, 1985) Popular known as C.A. was a Sierra Leonean politician and one of the founding members of the All People's Congress (APC), along with Siaka Stevens and Sorie Ibrahim Koroma.  He served as Minister of Finance of Sierra Leone from 1971 to 1975. He became Minister of Interior in 1975. After the introduction of a one party constitution in 1978, Mr. C.A. Kamara-Taylor became the  Second Vice-President of Sierra Leone, and held that post until his death in 1985.

Early life
Christian Alusine Kamara-Taylor was born on June 3, 1917 in the small rural town of Kafanta, Tonko Limba Chiefdom, Kambia District in the Northern Province of British Sierra Leone to Limba parents. He attended the thlocal primary school in Kambia and the Methodist Boys High School in Freetown. He attended the Accountancy Business school in London, where he obtained a diploma in Business Management. He returned Sierra Leone and gained employment as a clerk for the Sierra Leone Development Company. He later joined the Sierra Leone Regiment, rising to the position of sergeant. He saw service in Burma during World War II, but left the army after the war. He then joined the United African Company, and became public relations officer and secretary to the general manager.

Politics
Kamara-Taylor became active in local politics and was one of the founding members of the APC. He served as the first secretary-general of the party, a position he handled admirably for over fifteen years. He entered parliament in 1957. He contested the 1962 Sierra Leone general elections, and was elected a member of parliament from Kambia East Constituency. He retained his seat in the 1967 general elections and, after the return to civilian rule in 1968, was appointed Minister of Lands, Mines and Labour. Following a cabinet reshuffle in 1971, he was appointed Minister of Finance. He became Prime Minister and Minister of Interior in 1975. After the introduction of a one party constitution in 1978, Mr. C.A. Kamara-Taylor became Second Vice-President, and held that post until his death in 1985.

References

1917 births
1985 deaths
Vice-presidents of Sierra Leone
Prime Ministers of Sierra Leone
Finance ministers of Sierra Leone
All People's Congress politicians
People from Kambia District